James Cosmo Newbery  (28 June 1843 – 1 May 1895), generally referred to as Cosmo Newbery or J. Cosmo Newbery,  was a United States-educated Australian museum administrator and industrial chemist,  and co-developer of the Newbery-Vautin chlorination process for gold extraction.

Newbery was the fourth son of William Boxer Newbery, born near Livorno (Leghorn), Tuscany, Italy. When quite young he emigrated to America, and ultimately graduated as Bachelor of Science at Harvard University.

After leaving Harvard, Newbery studied at the Royal School of Mines, Jermyn Street, London, and in 1865 was appointed analyst to the Geological Survey of Victoria—an appointment which he held until 1868, when the department was abolished. In 1870 he was appointed to Superintendent of the Melbourne Industrial and Technological Museum and Analyst to the Department of Mines; he additionally assumed the role of Instructor in Chemistry and Metallurgy at the Museum Laboratory. Newbery was a member of the Royal Society of Victoria and was Honorary Superintendent of Juries and Awards at the Melbourne International Exhibition (1880). He married, in 1870, Catherine Maud Florence, daughter of George Hodgkinson. In 1881 he was created C.M.G.
Newbery collected food samples and analysed them for contaminants in his laboratory, laying the foundation for the prevention of adulterated foods of 1905. An improved method of gold extraction using chlorination—developed by Newbery and Claude Vautin in 1890 (the Newbery-Vautin chlorination process)—achieved global adoption, and Newbery was recognized as an authority on gold amalgamation.

Newbery died at home in Hotham Street, East St Kilda, Melbourne, Victoria on 1 May 1895.
The town of Cosmo Newbery, Western Australia is named for him.

References

External links
The Newbery-Vautin Chlorination Process at Gutenberg.org

1843 births
1895 deaths
Australian chemists
Australian metallurgists
19th-century Australian inventors
Companions of the Order of St Michael and St George
Harvard University alumni
19th-century Australian public servants
Italian emigrants to the United States
American emigrants to Australia